"Serdtse" (translated as "Heart") is in its version sung by Pyotr Leshchenko one of the most frequently performed Argentine Tango songs not sung in the Spanish language.

Title
Originally the song was referred to by its first line as Как много девушек хороших (Kak mnogo devushek khoroshikh, So many nice girls). It was written by Vasily Lebedev-Kumach for the 1934 Soviet film musical Jolly Fellows. The music was by Isaak Dunayevsky.  The first singer of the song was Leonid Utyosov.

In 1935, Pyotr Leshchenko started to sing the song in Argentine tango fashion.  Although music by Leshchenko was officially disliked in the Soviet Union, the version as sung by Leshchenko gradually became the norm. In the former Soviet Union, the song is still perceived as a traditional Russian romance, whereas elsewhere in the world, the song is seen exclusively as an Argentine tango song. This tango version was always known as Сердце (Serdtse), according to the popular convention of naming a song after its chorus. But the title change may also have come due to a mistake, since Serdtse was also the title of another song in the same musical.

In 1984, a collection of songs and poems by Vasily Lebedev-Kumach was published in Moscow. The text of this song was arranged in the Leshchenko fashion, but the title was quoted as Kak khorosho na svete zhit'! (How great it is to be alive!)

The Russian Romance version of the song has been translated in Polish as Jak wiele jest ładnych dziewczyn.

Later a native Lvivian, Yuri Hnatovsky, performed a Ukrainian version as a Dance cover-version of Yuriy Gnatkovski clip Heart featuring the Tango-club Street people.

Russian lyrics

Ukrainian lyrics

Other versions
The original version was sometimes sung with a refrain after both A and B.

The Russian pop group Aquarium in its 1996 rendition replaced the second (instrumental) part with

(C)Ya Vam pishu, chego ty bole?

Chto ya mogu eshchyo skazat'?

Теper' ya znayu - v Vashey vole

Меnya prezren'em nakazat'

(D)No mimо teshchinogo doma

Ya vsyo zh bez shutok ne khozhu:

То "Тikhiy Don" v оknо zаsunu

То "Kаmа-Sutru" pоkаzhu.

(followed by a complete Serdtse refrain)

Note that Akvarium called the song "Serdtse/Kak mnogo devushek khoroshikh". In the same year, Sergey Penkin did the same.

Line 3 and 4 of A are sometimes, e.g. by Konstantin Sokolsky rendered as:

"no lish' odno menya trevozhit

otgonyaya noch' i son, kogda vlyublyon"

While the second change ("chasing away my nightly sleep") does not affect the meaning, dropping "of them" in the third line may actually mean that the singer is not troubled by a girl's name, but by something else.

The film Jolly Fellows was shown in Tel Aviv and the Israeli poet Nathan Alterman wrote new lyrics to be used in the musical "Tel Aviv Ha'Ktana", entitling the song "Rina". The new words are a sardonic dialogue between two lovers.

Arguments 

Apart from the argument about the title, and about the original text (some sources say the author of the lyrics had a longer text in mind), there is also a problem with the exact meaning of the word "nice" ("khoroshiy").  Some translate as "good, well-mannered" (not naughty - a humorous approach), others translate as "pretty".

References

External links 

  Tango outside Argentina
  "Ruhm und bitterer tod des sängers Pjotr K. Leschenko"
 The "Jolly Fellows"  - both songs were by Isaak Dunayevsky, of course.
 Erdal Can Alkoçlar
  – the original film version
  sung in the traditional Russian style

Russian songs
Ukrainian songs
Soviet songs
1934 songs
Tangos
Tango in Russia
Articles containing video clips
Compositions by Isaak Dunayevsky